Tanki Online (TO) is a browser-based multiplayer free-to-play video game created and published by AlternativaPlatform. It was released on June 4, 2009. A remake of the game named Tanki X was released on April 20, 2017.

History
The game was presented in May 2009 at the KRI 2009 conference, where it won "Best Non-Publisher Game" and "Best Technology" awards. "Tanki Online" used the company's own game engine, Alternativa3D.
The release took place in the same year.
In 2013 and 2014, the project became the winner of the "Runet Prize" in the "Popular Vote" category.
It is considered the most popular game of the company, bringing $7 million in annual revenue with 2 million players per month (of which 90% are from Russia). In 2013, the number of registered users in the game reached 20 million, every day there were about 90 000 battles played totaling more than 700 000 game hours, and the maximum number of players online was 60 000.

Further Development
There was a new version of "Tanki Online" (called Tanki X), made by the same developers, however now they used the Unity engine instead of their own. Work on the game began in mid-2014. “Tanki X” was being developed in parallel with “Tanki Online”, but in the autumn of 2019 it was announced that the project was closing. The game shut down in early 2020. Some features were transferred to “Tanki Online”.

Game engine change
From the September 12, 2019, due to the end of Adobe Flash support, the server and network client of the game are based on HTML5. The new version has an updated interface and some other visual components. At the end of 2021, the Flash version of “Tanki Online” was discontinued, leaving HTML5 as the only playable version.

Gameplay
The gameplay of "Tanki Online" has some parallels with the famous classic game Battle City (1985). However, unlike Battle City, the basis of the gameplay of "Tanki Online" is a PVP system - player versus player. Players compete with each other, every destroyed tank counts a frag and the player who made the frag receives experience points.
The game has several battle modes (including teamplay-based modes), a system of military ranks and a lot of options for tank customization. Instead of choosing a tank from a premade list, players are encouraged to assemble their own battle machine, combining turrets, hulls, protective modules, drones, and decorative paints, according to their preferences.
When the player is finished with customizing their tank, they can enter into a battle with other players, where, in addition to experience points, they can earn one of the game currency - crystals. Moving up the career ladder, they open up access to new options and products.
The players can strengthen their tank on the battlefield with the help of supply drop boxes: increased damage, increased armor, nitrous and the repair kit. The fifth drop box is the “Nuclear Energy”, which when picked up recharges the Overdrive – a unique hull ability. Players also can purchase the supplies in the garage and use them on the battlefield anytime.
There are two currencies in the game: crystals and Tankoins.
Crystals are used to purchase equipment (turrets, hulls, protective modules and drones) in the garage, augments for turrets and supplies. Crystals are earned by playing in battles, completing challenges (Battle Pass), opening weekly and regular containers, opening coinboxes, taking Gold Boxes (drop boxes that contain 1000 crystals), exchanging Tankoins, using promocodes, and participating in contests from the game helpers and developers.
Players can buy regular containers, coinboxes, crystals, sets, skins, paints, the ability to change their nickname, a clan license, and Gold Boxes for Tankoins. Tankoins are earned by completing challenges, opening weekly containers, opening coinboxes, purchasing them with real money, using promocodes, and participating in contests from the game helpers and developers.

See also

External links

References 

2009 video games
Browser games
Massively multiplayer online games
Video games developed in Russia